Jews, Israel and Peace in Palestinian School Textbooks is a November 2001 publication by the Institute for Monitoring Peace and Cultural Tolerance in School Education (IMPACT-SE) -- then the Center for Monitoring the Impact of Peace (CMIP) -- on how Palestinian school textbooks portray peace and the 'Other', namely Jews and Israel. The publication is the first in a series of textbook analyses on Palestinian textbooks, with the most recent publication, Palestinian Textbooks: From Arafat to Abbas and Hamas, published in March 2008.

See also
 Institute for Monitoring Peace and Cultural Tolerance in School Education
 Textbooks in the Israeli–Palestinian conflict
 Textbooks in Israel
 Israeli–Palestinian conflict
 Arab–Israeli conflict

References

External links
 
 
 

Textbooks in the Middle East